The relationships between digital media use and mental health have been investigated by various researchers—predominantly psychologists, sociologists, anthropologists, and medical experts—especially since the mid-1990s, after the growth of the World Wide Web. A significant body of research has explored "overuse" phenomena, commonly known as "digital addictions", or "digital dependencies". These phenomena manifest differently in many societies and cultures. Some experts have investigated the benefits of moderate digital media use in various domains, including in mental health, and the treatment of mental health problems with novel technological solutions.

The delineation between beneficial and pathological use of digital media has not been established. There are no widely accepted diagnostic criteria, although some experts consider overuse a manifestation of underlying psychiatric disorders. The prevention and treatment of pathological digital media use is also not standardised, although guidelines for safer media use for children and families have been developed. The Diagnostic and Statistical Manual of Mental Disorders, Fifth Edition (DSM-5) and the International Classification of Diseases (ICD-11) do not include diagnoses for problematic internet use and problematic social media use; the ICD-11 include diagnosis for gaming disorder (commonly known as video game addiction), whereas the DSM-5 does not. Experts are still debating how and when to diagnose these conditions. The use of the term addiction to refer to these phenomena and diagnoses has also been questioned.

Digital media and screen time have changed how children think, interact and develop in positive and negative ways, but researchers are unsure about the existence of hypothesised causal links between digital media use and mental health outcomes. Those links appear to depend on the individual and the platforms they use. Several large technology firms have made commitments or announced strategies to try to reduce the risks of digital media use.

History and terminology 

The relationship between digital technology and mental health has been investigated from many perspectives. Benefits of digital media use in childhood and adolescent development have been found. Concerns have been expressed by researchers, clinicians and the public in regard to apparent compulsive behaviours of digital media users, as correlations between technology overuse and mental health problems become apparent.

Terminologies used to refer to compulsive digital-media-use behaviours are not standardised or universally recognised. They include "digital addiction", "digital dependence", "problematic use", or "overuse", often delineated by the digital media platform used or under study (such as problematic smartphone use or problematic internet use). Unrestrained use of technological devices may affect developmental, social, mental and physical well-being and may result in symptoms akin to other psychological dependence syndromes, or behavioural addictions. The focus on problematic technology use in research, particularly in relation to the behavioural addiction paradigm, is becoming more accepted, despite poor standardisation and conflicting research.

Internet addiction has been proposed as a diagnosis since the mid-1990s, and social media and its relation to addiction has been examined since 2009. A 2018 Organisation for Economic Co-operation and Development (OECD) report noted the benefits of structured and limited internet use in children and adolescents for developmental and educational purposes, but that excessive use can have a negative impact on mental well-being. It also noted an overall 40% increase in internet use in school-age children between 2010 and 2015, and that different OECD nations had marked variations in rates of childhood technology use, as well as differences in the platforms used.

The Diagnostic and Statistical Manual of Mental Disorders has not formally codified problematic digital media use in diagnostic categories, but it deemed internet gaming disorder to be a condition for further study in 2013. Gaming disorder, commonly known as video game addiction, has been recognised in the ICD-11. Different recommendations in the DSM and the ICD are due partly to the lack of expert consensus, the differences in emphasis in the classification manuals, as well as difficulties using animal models for behavioural addictions.

The utility of the term addiction in relation to overuse of digital media has been questioned, in regard to its suitability to describe new, digitally mediated psychiatric categories, as opposed to overuse being a manifestation of other psychiatric disorders. Usage of the term has also been criticised for drawing parallels with substance use behaviours. Careless use of the term may cause more problems—both downplaying the risks of harm in seriously affected people, as well as overstating risks of excessive, non-pathological use of digital media. The evolution of terminology relating excessive digital media use to problematic use rather than addiction was encouraged by Panova and Carbonell, psychologists at Ramon Llull University, in a 2018 review.

Due to the lack of recognition and consensus on the concepts used, diagnoses and treatments are difficult to standardise or develop. Heightened levels of public anxiety around new media (including social media, smartphones and video games) further obfuscate population-based assessments, as well as posing management dilemmas. Radesky and Christakis, the 2019 editors of JAMA Paediatrics, published a review that investigated "concerns about health and developmental/behavioural risks of excessive media use for child cognitive, language, literacy, and social-emotional development." Due to the ready availability of multiple technologies to children worldwide, the problem is bi-directional, as taking away digital devices may have a detrimental effect, in areas such as learning, family relationship dynamics, and overall development.

Problematic use
Though associations have been observed between digital media use and mental health symptoms or diagnoses, causality has not been established; nuances and caveats published by researchers are often misunderstood by the general public, or misrepresented by the media. Females are more likely to overuse social media, and males video games. Following from this, problematic digital media use may not be singular constructs, may be delineated based on the digital platform used, or reappraised in terms of specific activities (rather than addiction to the digital medium).

Screen time and mental health

In addition to noting with evolutionary biologist George C. Williams in the development of evolutionary medicine that most chronic medical conditions are the consequence of evolutionary mismatches between a stateless environment of nomadic hunter-gatherer life in bands and contemporary human life in sedentary technologically modern state societies (e.g. WEIRD societies), psychiatrist Randolph M. Nesse has argued that evolutionary mismatch is an important factor in the development of certain mental disorders. In 1890, 1 percent of U.S. households owned at least one telephone, while a majority did by 1946 and 75 percent did by 1957.
In 1908, 1 percent of U.S. households owned at least one automobile, while 50 percent did by 1948 and 75 percent did by 1960. In 1948, 1 percent of U.S. households owned at least one television while 75 percent did by 1955, and by 1992, 60 percent of all U.S. households received cable television subscriptions. In 1980, 1 percent of U.S. households owned at least one videocassette recorder while 75 percent did by 1992. From 1970 to 1999, the percentage of Americans aged 11–12 with a television in their bedroom grew from 6 percent to 77 percent. In 2000, a majority of U.S. households had at least one personal computer and internet access the following year.

In 2002, a majority of U.S. survey respondents reported having a mobile phone. In September and December 2006 respectively, Luxembourg and the Netherlands became the first countries to completely transition from analog to digital television, while the United States commenced its transition in 2008. In September 2007, a majority of U.S. survey respondents reported having broadband internet at home. In January 2013, a majority of U.S. survey respondents reported owning a smartphone. According to estimates from Nielsen Media Research, approximately 45.7 million U.S. households in 2006 (or approximately 40 percent of approximately 114.4 million) owned a dedicated home video game console, and by 2015, 51 percent of U.S. households owned a dedicated home video game console according to an Entertainment Software Association annual industry report.

A 2019 systematic map of reviews suggested associations between some types of potentially problematic internet use and psychiatric or behavioural problems such as depression, anxiety, hostility, aggression and attention deficit hyperactivity disorder (ADHD). The studies could not determine if causal relationships exist, reviewers emphasising the importance of future prospective study designs. While overuse of digital media has been associated with depressive symptoms, digital media may also be used in some situations to improve mood. Symptoms of ADHD have been positively correlated with digital media use in a large prospective study. The ADHD symptom of hyperfocus may cause affected individuals to overuse video games, social media, or online chatting, however; the correlation between hyperfocus and problematic social media use is weak. 

A 2016 technical report by Chassiakos, Radesky, and Christakis identified benefits and concerns in adolescent mental health regarding digital media use. It showed that the manner of social media use was the key factor, rather than the amount of time engaged. A decline in well-being and life-satisfaction was found in older adolescents who passively consumed social media, but these were not apparent in those who were more actively engaged. The report also found a U-shaped curvilinear relationship in the amount of time spent on digital media, with risk of depression increasing at both the low and high ends of internet use. A 2018 review into the Chinese social media platform WeChat found associations of self-reported mental health symptoms with excessive platform use. However, the motivations and usage patterns of WeChat users affected overall psychological health, rather than the amount of time spent using the platform. In the United Kingdom, a study of 1,479 individuals aged  compared psychological benefits and problems for five large social media platforms: Facebook, Instagram, Snapchat, Twitter and YouTube. It concluded that YouTube was the only platform with a net positive rating "based on the 14 health and wellbeing-related questions", and the other platforms measured had net negative ratings, Instagram having the lowest rating. The study identified Instagram as having some positive effects including self-expression, self-identity, and community, but found that these were outweighed by the negative effects, specifically on sleep, body image, and "fear of missing out".

The relationship between bipolar disorder and technology use has been investigated in a singular survey of 84 participants for Computers in Human Behavior. The survey found marked variations in technology use based on self-reported mood states. The authors of the report then postulated that for patients with bipolar disorder, technology may be a "double-edged sword", with potential benefits and harms.

In February 2019, experimental psychologists Amy Orben and Andrew K. Przybylski published a specification curve analysis of data from the Monitoring the Future survey, the Millennium Cohort Study, and the Youth Risk Behavior Surveillance System that included a total of 355,358 subjects in Nature Human Behaviour to examine the correlational evidence for negative effects of digital technology on adolescent well-being and found that digital technology use accounted for only 0.4% of the variance and that such a small change did not require public policy changes and that the weight given to digital screen time in scientific and public discourse is outsized. In May 2019, Orben and Przybylski published a subsequent specification curve analysis in Psychological Science of three nationally representative samples from data sets including 17,247 subjects from the Republic of Ireland, the United States, and the United Kingdom including time-use diary studies and found little evidence for substantial negative associations for digital screen engagement and adolescent well-being and noted that correlations between retrospective self-reports and time diaries are too low for retrospective self-reports to be useful.

A systematic examination of reviews, published in 2019, concluded that evidence, although of mainly low to moderate quality, showed an association of screen time with a variety of health problems including: "adiposity, unhealthy diet, depressive symptoms and quality of life". They also concluded that moderate use of digital media may have benefits for young people in terms of social integration, a curvilinear relationship found with both depressive symptoms and overall well-being.

A research study done on urban adolescents in China revealed that more than a quarter of adolescents in China were exposed to over 2 hours of screen time per day. They found that screen time and physical activity was independently associated with mental health. Specifically, an increase in screen time and decrease in physical activity contributed to an additional risk for mental health productivity by increasing depressive anxiety symptoms and life dissatisfaction.

A 2017 UK large-scale study of the "Goldilocks hypothesis"—of avoiding both too much and too little digital media use—was described as the "best quality" evidence to date by experts and non-government organisations (NGOs) reporting to a 2018 UK parliamentary committee. That study concluded that modest digital media use may have few adverse affects, and some positive associations in terms of well-being.

Social media and mental health
A 2022 umbrella review found there had been a "staggering increase" in recent studies looking at the relationship between mental health and social media use. Excessive time spent on social media may be more harmful than digital screen time as a whole. The 2022 umbrella study reported that several of the review-level articles published between 2019 & mid-2021 found a "substantial" association between social media use and mental health issues, but most found only a weak or inconsistent relationship. One of the 2020 meta studies finding only a small negative association between social media use and negative mental health outcomes still described it as significant.  A systematic review published in 2023 found there is nuanced evidence for a relationship between social media usage and flourishing, with the potential for this positive association to become stronger.

The 2019 Orben and Przybylski study has been much cited, and influential in supporting the view that there is little evidence to link digital usage with negative mental health outcomes. The study attracted responses from psychologists Jean Twenge, Andrew B. Blake, Jonathan Haidt, and W. Keith Campbell. They accepted that they could reach the same conclusion if they analysed the data in the same way that Orben and Przybylski had chosen to do so. But they found much stronger evidence of a negative association if they focused on social media, rather than digital screen time in the broadest sense, which includes watching TV and playing video games. Using the same data as Orben and Przybylski, they found an especially strong negative association between social media and mental health if they focussed just on the effect social media usage has on girls.

A study by The Lancet Child & Adolescent Health in 2019 showed a relationship between social media use by girls and an increase in their exposure to bullying plus a reduction in sleep and exercise.

A US study done in 2019 found an association between social media and depression in adolescence. Based on the upward social comparison, it may be that repeated exposure to idealized images lowers adolescents' self-esteem, triggers depression, and enhances depression over time. Furthermore, heavier users of social media with depression appear to be more negatively affected by their time spent on social media, potentially by the nature of the information that they select (e.g., blog posts about self-esteem issues), consequently potentially maintaining and enhancing depression over time.  A 2022 meta-study also found a significant association between social media use and depression, with the association especially high for adolescent girls.

Fear of missing out (FoMO) is a disruptive behavioral phenomenon that causes emotional stress. Studies show that the more social media accounts an individual has, the higher chance they have FoMO. There is a direct correlation between the number of accounts an individual has and the individual's levels of anxiety and depression.

Social media can be harmful, especially to pre-teens and teenagers who have little experience with their sense of body image. In a peer-reviewed article titled "The Paradox of Tik Tok Anti-Pro Anorexia Videos: How Social Media Can Promote Non-Suicidal Self-Injury and Anorexia" writers stated the impact that TikTok has on this generation, especially since the beginning of COVID-19. While exposure to anorexic bodies can be harmful to adolescents, writers claim that it could be helpful to talk about it. It appears that videos showing thinner bodies got more exposure, likes, and engagement than the videos showing bodies with a bigger frame.

There has been research showing that 84 percent of participants exposed to pro-ED social media developed symptoms of an eating disorder, along with depression and anxiety. A study showed that only 14 percent of the individuals experiencing symptoms received treatment. The common treatment barriers were not believing their symptoms were serious enough to seek help, or thinking they could just help themselves. These results show that the majority of people who are affected by eating disorders by social media will not get the help they need to recover. Additionally, diet-focused social media trends like "What I eat in a day" videos have been shown to have negative impacts on body image.

ADHD

In September 2014, Developmental Psychology published a meta-analysis of 45 studies investigating the relationship between media use and ADHD-related behaviors in children and adolescents and found a small but significant relationship between media use and ADHD-related behaviors. In March 2016, Frontiers in Psychology published a survey of 457 post-secondary student Facebook users (following a face validity pilot of another 47 post-secondary student Facebook users) at a large university in North America showing that the severity of ADHD symptoms had a statistically significant positive correlation with Facebook usage while driving a motor vehicle and that impulses to use Facebook while driving were more potent among male users than female users. In June 2018, Children and Youth Services Review published a regression analysis of 283 adolescent Facebook users in the Piedmont and Lombardy regions of Northern Italy (that replicated previous findings among adult users) showing that adolescents reporting higher ADHD symptoms positively predicted Facebook addiction, persistent negative attitudes about the past and that the future is predetermined and not influenced by present actions, and orientation against achieving future goals, with ADHD symptoms additionally increasing the manifestation of the proposed category of psychological dependence known as "problematic social media use."

In April 2015, the Pew Research Center published a survey of 1,060 U.S. teenagers ages 13 to 17 who reported that nearly three-quarters of them either owned or had access to a smartphone, 92 percent went online daily with 24 percent saying they went online "almost constantly." Citing Centers for Disease Control data showing that nearly one-fourth of all deaths in the United States in 2014 for people ages 15 to 24 were in motor vehicle accidents, psychiatrist Randolph M. Nesse has noted that fear of dangers in operating a motor vehicle cannot have a prewired learning module, and along with evolutionary biologist George C. Williams and psychiatrist Isaac Marks, Nesse has noted that people with systematically deficient fear responses to various adaptive phobias (e.g. basophobia, ophidiophobia, arachnophobia) are more temperamentally careless and more likely to receive unintentional injuries that are potentially fatal, and Marks, Williams, and Nesse have proposed that such deficient phobia should be classified as "hypophobia" due to its selfish genetic consequences.

In July 2018, the Journal of the American Medical Association published a two-month longitudinal cohort survey of 3,051 U.S. teenagers ages 15 and 16 (recruited at 10 different Los Angeles County, California secondary schools by convenience sampling) self-reporting engagement in 14 different modern digital media activities at high-frequency. 2,587 had no significant symptoms of ADHD at baseline with a mean number of 3.62 modern digital media activities used at high-frequency and each additional activity used frequently at baseline positively correlating with a significantly higher frequency of ADHD symptoms at follow-ups. Of the 495 who reported no high-frequency digital media activities at baseline had a 4.6% mean rate of having ADHD symptoms at follow-ups, while the 114 who reported 7 high-frequency activities had a 9.5% mean rate and the 51 with 14 high-frequency activities had a 10.5% mean rate (indicating a statistically significant but modest association between higher frequency of digital media use and subsequent symptoms of ADHD). In October 2018, PNAS USA published a systematic review of four decades of research on the relationship between children and adolescents' screen media use and ADHD-related behaviors and concluded that a statistically small relationship between children's media use and ADHD-related behaviors exists.

In April 2019, PLOS One published the results of a longitudinal birth cohort study of screen-time use reported by parents of 2,322 children in Canada at ages 3 and 5 and found that compared to children with less than 30 minutes per day of screen-time, children with more than 2 hours of screen-time per day had a 7.7-fold increased risk of meeting criteria for ADHD. In January 2020, the Italian Journal of Pediatrics published a cross-sectional study of 1,897 children from ages 3 through 6 attending 42 kindergartens in Wuxi, China that also found that children exposed to more than 1 hour of screen-time per day were at increased risk for the development of ADHD and noted its similarity to a finding relating screen-time and the development of autism (ASD). In November 2020, Infant Behavior and Development published a study of 120 3-year-old children with or without family histories of ASD or ADHD (20 with ASD, 14 with ADHD, and 86 for comparison) examining the relationship between screen time, behavioral outcomes, and expressive/receptive language development that found that higher screen time was associated with lower expressive/receptive language scores across comparison groups and that screen time was associated with behavioral phenotype, not family history of ASD or ADHD.

In the journal Globalization and Health Article number: Vol 17(48) (2021) Shauai 
et al. published a study titled Influences of digital media use on children and adolescents with ADHD during COVID-19 pandemic. They explored the influence of digital media on the core symptoms, emotional state, life events, learning motivation, executive function (EF), and family environment of children and adolescents diagnosed with ADHD. They included participants age 8 to 16 who met the criteria for ADHD and included a group who had problematic digital media use (PDMU) and a group who met the ADHD criteria who did not have PDMU.
The study analyzed the differences between the groups in ADHD symptoms, EF, anxiety, and depression, stress from life events, learning motivation, and family environment were compared respectively.
The research concluded that the ADHD children with PDMU displayed more severe symptoms, negative emotions, impairments in executive functioning, difficulties in family functioning, pressure from life events, and a lower learning motivation than those who did not have PMDU.
The research suggested that for children and adolescents who struggle with ADHD, it is essential to supervise digital media usage and increase physical exercise for better management of core symptoms and other associated difficulties associated with ADHD.

Researchers Siddharth Sagar, Dr. Navin Kumarhttp published a study in Psychology and Education Vol.58 No.4 (2021) titled Usages of Social Media and Symptoms of Attention Deficit Hyperactivity Disorder (ADHD): A Cross-Sectional Study. The study aimed to empirically test the association between social media usage and ADHD. They hypothesized that social media users will significantly differ in demographic variables such as age, gender, and education and that ADHD would be significantly associated with social media usage. 
The study did suggest that ADHD is significantly associated with addictive or excessive social media use and that addictive social media use was associated with being female, being a young individual, and with undergraduate-aged individuals. It further concluded that ADHD is more prevalent in individuals with high social media usage. The authors suggested this may be due to social media being an ideal outlet for constant touching, fidgeting, and frequent shifts from one activity to another when bored or feeling inattentive. These are common ADHD behaviors (American Psychiatric Association, 2013).

Autism

In February 2017, PLOS One published a systematic review of 35 studies examining the prevalence of physical activity and sedentary behaviors and their potential correlates among children with autism spectrum disorder (ASD) and found that 15 reported physical activity prevalence, 10 reported physical activity correlates, 18 reported sedentary behavior prevalence, and 10 reported sedentary behavior correlates, and age was consistently inversely associated with physical activity, but noted that all but one of the studies were classified as having high risk of selection bias and that more research was needed to consistently identify the correlates of the behaviors. In September 2017, Scientific Reports published a meta-analysis of 15 epidemiological studies totaling 49,937,078 participants including 1,045,538 with ASD used a random effects model to examine associations between obesity, overweight, and ASD and found that while the prevalence of overweight participants with ASD was not significantly different from the control group, the prevalence of obesity was significantly higher among ASD participants than the control group.

In April 2018, Child and Adolescent Psychiatric Clinics of North America published a study of data from the American Academy of Child and Adolescent Psychiatry that found that children with ASD surveyed spent 4.5 hours more per day on screen time than typically developing peers, that children with ASD spent most of their free time on screen time as compared with 18% of typically developing peers, and that children with ASD played video games 1 hour more per day than typically developing peers and tended to prefer video games over television. Conversely, more than half of children with ASD surveyed had never played with a friend over electronic media, with only 15% engaging with friends in this way on a weekly basis and 64% using electronic media primarily non-socially (e.g. to play video games alone or with strangers, or surfing gaming web sites).

In October 2018, Evidence-Based Mental Health published a meta-analysis of 47 data sets using a random effects model to examine associations between sleep problems and ASD on 14 subjective and 14 objective sleep parameters and found that as compared with control groups, ASD participants differed significantly on 10 of the 14 subjective parameters and 7 of the 14 objective parameters. In November 2018, the Journal of Autism and Developmental Disorders published a study examining associations between environmental factors physical activity and screen time among 1,380 children with ASD and 1,411 children without ASD and found that the absence of a bedroom television and neighborhood support for children without ASD were associated with physical activity, while a bedroom television and no parental limits on screen time was associated with screen time for children with ASD.

In May 2019, Behavioral Sciences published an online parental survey of 327 children with ASD that found that children with ASD mostly use television and after conducting 13 in-person interviews with parents the researchers concluded that screen media usage by children with ASD should be supervised. In November 2020, Infant Behavior and Development published a study of 120 3-year-old children with or without family histories of ASD or ADHD (20 with ASD, 14 with ADHD, and 86 for comparison) examining the relationship between screen time, behavioral outcomes, and expressive/receptive language development that found that higher screen time was associated with lower expressive/receptive language scores across comparison groups and that screen time was associated with behavioral phenotype, not family history of ASD or ADHD.

In February 2021, Frontiers in Psychiatry published a study of 101 children with ASD and 57 children without ASD to examine the relationship between screen time of children with ASD and their development quotients and found that screen time for children with ASD was longer among children with ASD (3.34 ± 2.64 hours) than children without (0.91 ± 0.93 hours) and screen time for children with ASD was positively correlated with the Childhood Autism Rating Scale.

Insomnia

In August 2018, Sleep Medicine Reviews published a meta-analysis performed by psychiatrists Wai Sze Chan, Meredith P. Levsen, and Christina S. McCrae of 67 studies published since 2008 that found that multilevel random effects models showed that the odds of being obese among those who had an insomnia diagnosis was not significantly greater than the odds of being obese and not receiving an insomnia diagnosis, while a small but significant cross-sectional correlation was found between insomnia symptoms and body mass index, longitudinal data was limited to three studies that showed that developing insomnia symptoms in the future among the obese was not significantly greater than among the non-obese, finding the research to be inconclusive.

In May 2019, Sleep Medicine published a study of 2,865 U.S. adolescents at the age 15 follow-up of the Fragile Families and Child Wellbeing Study who completed surveys quantifying personal sleep duration and insomnia symptoms, screen time use of social messaging, web surfing, television or movie watching, and gaming, and depressive systems and the researchers constructed a multiple mediation model while controlling for depressive symptoms at age 9 to identify associations between age 15 screen time, sleep, and depressive symptoms, and found through structural equation modeling that the association for social messaging, web surfing, and television and movie watching, the three sleep variables fully mediated the positive association between screen time and depressive symptoms while for gaming the sleep variables only accounted for 38.5% of the association between gaming and depressive symptoms.

In November 2019, Psychiatry Research published a study of a nationally representative sample of 14,603 U.S. adolescents aged 14–18 years from the 2017 Youth Risk Behavior Survey examining the association between excessive screen time and behaviors and insufficient sleep among adolescents using a logistic regression with insufficient sleep and the excessive screen time behaviors as the outcome and explanatory variables respectively and found that the odds for adolescents engaging in excessive screen time behaviors to be receiving insufficient sleep (controlling for all other predictors) was 1.34 times higher than adolescents not engaging in excessive screen time behaviors, with 74.8% of adolescents in the survey receiving less than 8 hours of sleep on an average school night and 43% engaging in excessive screen behaviors.

In December 2019, Eating and Weight Disorders – Studies on Anorexia, Bulimia and Obesity published a survey of a sample of 6,419 adults in Mexico from the 2016 National Health and Nutrition Survey in self-reported differences in sleep duration, insomnia symptoms, television screen time, total screen time, degree of physical activity with body mass index used to categorize participants and found that of the 39% and 37% of participants categorized as overweight and obese respectively, television screen time, total screen time, sleep duration, and physical activity were significantly correlated with being overweight or obese, with Obese II and Obese III participants spending 30 minutes on average more than normal weight participants in front of any screen and Obese II reporting 30 minutes less sleep on average and Obese III less likely to engage in physical activity.

In February 2020, Sleep Medicine Reviews published a systematic review of 31 studies examining associations between screen time or movement behaviors (sedentary vs. physical activity) and sleep outcomes in children younger than 5 years following the Preferred Reporting Items for Systematic Reviews and Meta-Analyses guidelines and that performed a Grading of Recommendations Assessment, Development and Evaluation with subjects stratified by age and found that screen time is associated with poorer sleep outcomes for children under the age of 5, with meta-analysis only confirming poor sleep outcomes among children under 2 years while for movement behaviors evidence was mixed but that physical activity and outdoor play among children 1–4 were favorably associated.

NPD

In July 2018, a meta-analysis published in Psychology of Popular Media found that grandiose narcissism positively correlated with time spent on social media, frequency of status updates, number of friends or followers, and frequency of posting self-portrait digital photographs, while a meta-analysis published in the Journal of Personality in April 2018 found that the positive correlation between grandiose narcissism and social networking service usage was replicated across platforms (including Facebook and Twitter). In March 2020, the Journal of Adult Development published a regression discontinuity analysis of 254 Millennial Facebook users investigating differences in narcissism and Facebook usage between the age cohorts born from 1977 to 1990 and from 1991 to 2000 and found that the later born Millennials scored significantly higher on both. In June 2020, Addictive Behaviors published a systematic review finding a consistent, positive, and significant correlation between grandiose narcissism and problematic social media use. Also in 2018, social psychologist Jonathan Haidt and FIRE President Greg Lukianoff noted in The Coddling of the American Mind that former Facebook president Sean Parker stated in a 2017 interview that the Facebook like button was consciously designed to prime users receiving likes to feel a dopamine rush as part of a "social-validation feedback loop".

"Conspicuous compassion" is the practice of publicly donating large sums of money to charity to enhance the social prestige of the donor, and is sometimes described as a type of conspicuous consumption. Jonathan Haidt and Greg Lukianoff argued that microaggression training on college campuses in the United States has led to a call-out culture and a climate of self-censorship due to fear of shaming by virtue signalling social media mobs with users who are often anonymous and tend to deindividuate as a consequence. Citing February 2017 Pew Research Center survey data showing that critical Facebook postings expressing "indignant disagreement" were twice as likely to receive likes, comments, or shares (along with a similar finding for Twitter posts published in PNAS USA in July 2017), Haidt and Tobias Rose-Stockwell cited the phrase "moral grandstanding" in The Atlantic in December 2019 to describe how having an audience on social media forums converts much of its interpersonal communication into a public performance.

Following the murder of George Floyd in May 2020 and the subsequent protests in his name, Civiqs and YouGov/Economist polls showed that while net support for Black Lives Matter among White Americans increased from −4 points to +10 points in early June 2020 (with 43 percent in support) it fell to −6 points by early August 2020, and by April 2021, further Civiqs polls showed that support for Black Lives Matter among White Americans had reverted to roughly its level of support prior to George Floyd's murder (37 percent in favor and 49 percent opposed). In a February 2021 interview on Firing Line, journalist Charles M. Blow criticized a minority of young white protestors in the George Floyd protests in the United States whom he argued were using the protests for their own personal growth to substitute for social rites of passage (e.g. prom) and summertime social gatherings (e.g. attending movie theaters or concerts) that were precluded by COVID-19 lockdowns and social distancing measures, noting that as lockdowns began to be relaxed and removed, support for Black Lives Matter among whites began to decline.

In February 2021, Psychological Medicine published a survey reviewing 14,785 publicly reported murders in English language news worldwide between 1900 and 2019 compiled in a database by psychiatrists at the New York State Psychiatric Institute and the Columbia University Irving Medical Center that found that of the 1,315 personal-cause mass murders (i.e. driven by personal motivations and not occurring within the context of war, state-sponsored or group-sponsored terrorism, gang activity, or organized crime) only 11 percent of mass murderers and only 8 percent of mass shooters had a "serious mental illness" (e.g. schizophrenia, bipolar disorder, major depressive disorder), that mass shootings have become more common than other forms of mass murder since 1970 (with 73 percent occurring in the United States alone), and that mass shooters in the United States were more likely to have legal histories, to engage in recreational drug use or alcohol abuse, and to display non-psychotic psychiatric or neurologic symptoms.

Survey coauthor psychiatrist Paul S. Appelbaum argued that the data from the survey indicated that "difficulty coping with life events seem more useful foci for prevention [of mass shootings] and policy than an emphasis on serious mental illness", while psychiatrist Ronald W. Pies has suggested that psychopathology should be understood as a three-gradation continuum of mental, behavioral and emotional disturbance with most mass shooters falling into a middle category of "persistent emotional disturbance". In 2015, psychiatrists James L. Knoll and George D. Annas noted that the tendency of most media attention following mass shootings on mental health leads to sociocultural factors being comparatively overlooked. Instead, Knoll and Annas cite research by social psychologists Jean Twenge and W. Keith Campbell on narcissism and social rejection in the personal histories of mass shooters, as well as cognitive scientist Steven Pinker's suggestion in The Better Angels of Our Nature (2011) that further reductions in human violence may be dependent upon reducing human narcissism.

Proposed diagnostic categories 

Gaming disorder has been considered by the DSM-5 task force as warranting further study (as the subset internet gaming disorder), and was included in the ICD-11. Concerns have been raised by Aarseth and colleagues over this inclusion, particularly in regard to stigmatisation of heavy gamers.

Christakis has asserted that internet addiction may be "a 21st century epidemic". In 2018, he commented that childhood Internet overuse may be a form of  "uncontrolled experiment[s] on ... children". International estimates of the prevalence of internet overuse have varied considerably, with marked variations by nation. A 2014 meta-analysis of 31 nations yielded an overall worldwide prevalence of six percent. A different perspective in 2018 by Musetti and colleagues reappraised the internet in terms of its necessity and ubiquity in modern society, as a social environment, rather than a tool, thereby calling for the reformulation of the internet addiction model.

Some medical and behavioural scientists recommend adding a diagnosis of "social media addiction" (or similar) to the next Diagnostic and Statistical Manual of Mental Disorders update. A 2015 review concluded there was a probable link between basic psychological needs and social media addiction. "Social network site users seek feedback, and they get it from hundreds of people—instantly. It could be argued that the platforms are designed to get users 'hooked'."

Internet sex addiction, also known as cybersex addiction, has been proposed as a sexual addiction characterised by virtual internet sexual activity that causes serious negative consequences to one's physical, mental, social, and/or financial well-being. It may be considered a form of problematic internet use.

Related phenomena

Online problem gambling 

A 2015 review found evidence of higher rates of mental health comorbidities, as well as higher amounts of substance use, among internet gamblers, compared to non-internet gamblers. Causation, however, has not been established. The review postulates that there may be differences in the cohorts between internet and land-based problem gamblers.

Cyberbullying

Cyberbullying, bullying or harassment using social media or other electronic means, has been shown to have effects on mental health. Victims may have lower self-esteem, increased suicidal ideation, decreased motivation for usual hobbies, and a variety of emotional responses, including being scared, frustrated, angry, anxious or depressed. These victims may also begin to distance themselves from friends and family members.

According to the EU Kids Online project, the incidence of cyberbullying across seven European countries in children aged  increased from 8% to 12% between 2010 and 2014. Similar increases were shown in the United States and Brazil.

Media multitasking

Concurrent use of multiple digital media streams, commonly known as media multitasking, has been shown to be associated with depressive symptoms, social anxiety, impulsivity, sensation seeking, lower perceived social success and neuroticism. A 2018 review found that while the literature is sparse and inconclusive, overall, heavy media multitaskers also have poorer performance in several cognitive domains. One of the authors commented that the data does not "unambiguously show that media multitasking causes a change in attention and memory", therefore it is possible to argue that it is inefficient to multitask on digital media.

Assessment and treatment
Rigorous, evidence-based assessment of problematic digital media use is yet to be comprehensively established. This is due partially to a lack of consensus around the various constructs and lack of standardization of treatments. The American Academy of Pediatrics (AAP) has developed a Family Media Plan, intending to help parents assess and structure their family's use of electronic devices and media more safely. It recommends limiting entertainment screen time to two hours or less per day. The Canadian Paediatric Society produced a similar guideline. Ferguson, a psychologist, has criticised these and other national guidelines for not being evidence-based. Other experts, cited in a 2017 UNICEF Office of Research literature review, have recommended addressing potential underlying problems rather than arbitrarily enforcing screen time limits.

Different methodologies for assessing pathological internet use have been developed, mostly self-report questionnaires, but none have been universally recognised as a gold standard. For gaming disorder, both the American Psychiatric Association and the World Health Organization (through the ICD-11) have released diagnostic criteria.

There is some limited evidence of the effectiveness of cognitive behavioral therapy and family-based interventions for treatment. In randomised controlled trials, medications have not been shown to be effective. A 2016 study of 901 adolescents suggested mindfulness may assist in preventing and treating problematic internet use. A 2019 UK parliamentary report deemed parental engagement, awareness and support to be essential in developing "digital resilience" for young people, and to identify and manage the risks of harm online. Treatment centers have proliferated in some countries, and China and South Korea have treated digital dependence as a public health crisis, opening 300 and 190 centers nationwide, respectively. Other countries have also opened treatment centers.

NGOs, support and advocacy groups provide resources to people overusing digital media, with or without codified diagnoses, including the American Academy of Child and Adolescent Psychiatry.

A 2022 study outlines the mechanisms by which media-transmitted stressors affect mental well-being. Authors suggest a common denominator related to problems with the media's construction of reality is increased uncertainty, which leads to defensive responses and chronic stress in predisposed individuals.

Mental health benefits
Individuals with mental illness can develop social connections over social media, that may foster a sense of social inclusion in online communities. People with mental illness may share personal stories in a perceived safer space, as well as gaining peer support for developing coping strategies.

People with mental illness are likely to report avoiding stigma and gaining further insight into their mental health condition by using social media. This comes with the risk of unhealthy influences, misinformation, and delayed access to traditional mental health outlets.

Other benefits include connections to supportive online communities, including illness or disability specific communities, as well as the LGBTQIA community. Young cancer patients have reported an improvement in their coping abilities due to their participation in an online community. The uses of social media for healthcare communication include providing reducing stigma and facilitating dialogue between patients and between patients and health professionals.

Furthermore, in children, the educational benefits of digital media use are well established. For example, screen-based programs can help increase both independent and collaborative learning. A variety of quality apps and software can also decrease learning gaps and increase skill in certain educational subjects. 

According to the American Addiction Centers, apps like TikTok are also helpful for its users to share their stories of recovery, celebrating milestones, and cheering on others on the path to recovery. Hashtags such as, #sober, #mentalhealthawareness, and #soberlife are helping to destigmatize sobriety.

Other disciplines

Digital anthropology
Daniel Miller from University College London has contributed to the study of digital anthropology, especially ethnographic research on the use and consequences of social media and smartphones as part of the everyday life of ordinary people around the world. He notes the effects of social media are very specific to individual locations and cultures. He contends "a layperson might dismiss these stories as superficial. But the anthropologist takes them seriously, empathetically exploring each use of digital technologies in terms of the wider social and cultural context."

Digital anthropology is a developing field which studies the relationship between humans and digital-era technology. It aims to consider arguments in terms of ethical and societal scopes, rather than simply observing technological changes. Brian Solis, a digital analyst and anthropologist, stated in 2018, "we've become digital addicts: it's time to take control of technology and not let tech control us".

Digital sociology
Digital sociology explores how people use digital media using several research methodologies, including surveys, interviews, focus groups, and ethnographic research. It intersects with digital anthropology, and studies cultural geography. It also investigates longstanding concerns, and contexts around young people's overuse of "these technologies, their access to online pornography, cyber bullying or online sexual predation".

A 2012 cross-sectional sociological study in Turkey showed differences in patterns of internet use that related to levels of religiosity in 2,698 subjects. With increasing religiosity, negative attitudes towards internet use increased. Highly religious people showed different motivations for internet use, predominantly searching for information. A study of 1,296 Malaysian adolescent students found an inverse relationship between religiosity and internet addiction tendency in females, but not males.

A 2018 review published in Nature considered that young people may have different experiences online, depending on their socio-economic background, noting lower-income youths may spend up to three hours more per day using digital devices, compared to higher-income youths. They theorised that lower-income youths, who are already vulnerable to mental illness, may be more passive in their online engagements, being more susceptible to negative feedback online, with difficulty self-regulating their digital media use. It concluded that this may be a new form of digital divide between at-risk young people and other young people, pre-existing risks of mental illness becoming amplified among the already vulnerable population.

Neuroscience
Dar Meshi and colleagues noted in 2015 that  are beginning to capitalise on the ubiquity of social media use to gain novel insights about social cognitive processes". A 2018 neuroscientific review published in Nature found the density of the amygdala, a brain region involved in emotional processing, is related to the size of both offline and online social networks in adolescents. They considered that this and other evidence "suggests an important interplay between actual social experiences, both offline and online, and brain development". The authors postulated that social media may have benefits, namely social connections with other people, as well as managing impressions people have of other people such as "reputation building, impression management, and online self-presentation". It identified "adolescence [as] a tipping point in development for how social media can influence their self-concept and expectations of self and others", and called for further study into the neuroscience behind digital media use and brain development in adolescence. Although brain-imaging modalities are under study, neuroscientific findings in individual studies often fail to be replicated in future studies, similar to other behavioural addictions; as of 2017, the exact biological or neural processes that could lead to excessive digital media use are unknown.

Impact on cognition
There is research and development about the cognitive impacts of smartphones and digital technology. A group reported that, contrary to widespread belief, scientific evidence doesn't show that these technologies harm biological cognitive abilities and that they instead only change predominant ways of cognition – such as a reduced need to remember facts or conduct mathematical calculations by pen and paper outside contemporary schools. However, some activities – like reading novels – that require long focused attention-spans and don't feature ongoing rewarding stimulation may become more challenging in general. How extensive online media usage impacts cognitive development in youth is under investigation and impacts may substantially vary by the way and which technologies are being used – such as which and how digital media platforms are being used – and how these are designed. Impacts may vary to a degree such studies have not yet taken into account and may be modulatable by the design, choice and use of technologies and platforms, including by the users themselves.

A study suggests that in children aged 8–12 during two years, time digital gaming or watching digital videos can be positively correlated with measures intelligence, albeit correlations with overall screen time (including social media, socializing and TV) were not investigated and 'time gaming' did not differentiate between categories of video games (e.g. shares of games' platform and genre), and digital videos did not differentiate between categories of videos.

Impact on social life
Worldwide adolescent loneliness in contemporary schools and depression increased substantially after 2012 and a study found this to be associated with smartphone access and Internet use. However, smartphone and Internet technologies also have potentials and implemented use-cases for positive impacts on social life which is inextricably linked to mental health.

On Friday 6 January 2023, the Seattle Public School District filed a lawsuit against major social media platforms such as TikTok, Instagram, Facebook, YouTube and Snapchat. The 91-page document claims the mental health of their students have worsened and these feelings have increased by 30 percent from 2009 to 2019. This has caused the district to hire more mental health professionals on campuses to support instructors and faculty. Section 230 of the Communications Decency Act has protected such platforms from being held liable for issues around what is posted by users, but in this case, there is a push to hold these platforms accountable for their behavior regarding algorithms.

Digital mental health care

Digital technologies have also provided opportunities for delivery of mental health care online; benefits have been found with computerised cognitive behavioural therapy for depression and anxiety. Research of digital health interventions in young people is preliminary, with a meta-review unable to draw firm conclusions because of problems in research methodology. Potential benefits according to one review include "the flexibility, interactivity, and spontaneous nature of mobile communications ... in encouraging persistent and continual access to care outside clinical settings". Mindfulness based online intervention has been shown to have small to moderate benefits on mental health. The greatest effect size was found for the reduction of psychological stress. Benefits were also found regarding depression, anxiety, and well-being. Smartphone applications have proliferated in many mental health domains, with "demonstrably effective" recommendations listed in a 2016 review encouraging cognitive behavioural therapy, addressing both anxiety and mood. The review did however call for more randomised controlled trials to validate the effectiveness of their recommendations when delivered by digital apps.

The Lancet commission on global mental health and sustainability report from 2018 evaluated both benefits and harms of technology. It considered the roles of technologies in mental health, particularly in public education; patient screening; treatment; training and supervision; and system improvement. A study in 2019 published in Front Psychiatry in the National Center for Biotechnology Information states that despite proliferation of many mental health apps there has been no "equivalent proliferation of scientific evidence for their effectiveness."

Steve Blumenfield and Jeff Levin-Scherz, writing in the Harvard Business Review, claim that "most published studies show telephonic mental health care is as effective as in-person care in treating depression, anxiety and obsessive-compulsive disorder." The also cite a 2020 study done with the Veterans Administration as evidence of this as well.

Industry and government 
Several technology firms have implemented changes intending to mitigate the adverse effects of excessive use of their platforms, and in Japan, China and South Korea legislative and/or regulatory governmental efforts have been enacted to address the interrelated issues.

In December 2017, Facebook admitted passive consumption of social media could be harmful to mental health, although they said active engagement can have a positive effect. In January 2018, the platform made major changes to increase user engagement. In January 2019, Facebook's then head of global affairs, Nick Clegg, responding to criticisms of Facebook and mental health concerns, stated they would do "whatever it takes to make this environment safer online especially for youngsters". Facebook admitted "heavy responsibilities" to the global community, and invited regulation by governments. In 2018 Facebook and Instagram announced new tools that they asserted may assist with overuse of their products. In 2019, Instagram, which has been investigated specifically in one study in terms of addiction, began testing a platform change in Canada to hide the number of "likes" and views that photos and videos received in an effort to create a "less pressurised" environment. It then continued this trial in Australia, Italy, Ireland, Japan, Brazil and New Zealand before extending the experiment globally in November of that year. The platform also developed artificial intelligence to counter cyberbullying.

China's Ministry of Culture has enacted several public health efforts from as early as 2006 to address gaming and internet-related disorders. In 2007, an "Online Game Anti-Addiction System" was implemented for minors, restricting their use to 3 hours or less per day. The ministry also proposed a "Comprehensive Prevention Program Plan for Minors' Online Gaming Addiction" in 2013, to promulgate research, particularly on diagnostic methods and interventions. China's Ministry of Education in 2018 announced that new regulations would be introduced to further limit the amount of time spent by minors in online games. In response, Tencent, the owner of WeChat and the world's largest video game publisher, restricted the amount of time that children could spend playing one of its online games, to one hour per day for children 12 and under, and two hours per day for children aged .

In 2018, Alphabet Inc. released an update for Android smartphones, including a dashboard app enabling users to set timers on application use. Apple Inc. purchased a third-party application and then incorporated it in iOS 12 to measure "screen time". Journalists have questioned the functionality of these products for users and parents, as well as the companies' motivations for introducing them. Alphabet has also invested in a mental health specialist, Quartet, which uses machine learning to collaborate and coordinate digital delivery of mental health care.

South Korea has eight government ministries responsible for public health efforts in relation to internet and gaming disorders, a review article published in Prevention Science in 2018 stating that the "region is unique in that its government has been at the forefront of prevention efforts, particularly in contrast to the United States, Western Europe, and Oceania." Efforts are coordinated by the Ministry of Science and ICT, and include awareness campaigns, educational interventions, youth counseling centres, and promoting healthy online culture.

Two institutional investors in Apple Inc., JANA Partners LLC and the California State Teachers' Retirement System (CalSTRS), stated in 2018 that they "believe[d] both the content and the amount of time spent on phones need to be tailored to youths". They called on Apple Inc. to act before regulators and consumers potentially force them to do so. Apple Inc. responded that they have, "always looked out for kids, and [they] work hard to create powerful products that inspire, entertain, and educate children while also helping parents protect them online". The firm is planning new features that they asserted may allow them to play a pioneering role in regard to young people's health.

Japan's Ministry of Internal Affairs and Communications coordinates Japanese public health efforts in relation to problematic internet use and gaming disorder. Legislatively, the Act on Development of an Environment that Provides Safe and Secure Internet Use for Young People was enacted in 2008, to promote public awareness campaigns, and support NGOs to teach young people safe internet use skills.

See also
Evolutionary psychiatry
Instagram's impact on people
Screen time
Social aspects of television

References

Further reading

 
 
 

 Woods, H. C., & Scott, H. (2016). #Sleepyteens: Social media use in adolescence is associated with poor sleep quality, anxiety, depression and low self‐esteem. Journal of Adolescence, 51(1), 41–49. https://doi.org/10.1016/j.adolescence.2016.05.008
 Jones, A., Hook, M., Podduturi, P., McKeen, H., Beitzell, E., & Liss, M. (2022). Mindfulness as a mediator in the relationship between social media engagement and depression in young adults. Personality and Individual Differences, 185. https://doi.org/10.1016/j.paid.2021.111284
 White-Gosselin, C.-É., & Poulin, F. (2022). Associations between young adults’ social media addiction, relationship quality with parents, and internalizing problems: A path analysis model. Canadian Journal of Behavioural Science / Revue Canadienne Des Sciences Du Comportement. https://doi.org/10.1037/cbs0000326
 Hammad, M. A., & Alqarni, T. M. (2021). Psychosocial effects of social media on the Saudi society during the Coronavirus Disease 2019 pandemic: A cross-sectional study. PLoS ONE, 16(3). https://doi.org/10.1371/journal.pone.0248811

External links
 
 Anthropology of Social Media: Why We Post, University College London, Free online five-week course, asking "What are the consequences of social media?"
 Social Media Use and Mental Health: A Review – ongoing review curated by Jean Twenge & Jonathan Haidt.

 
Cultural anthropology
Cyberspace
Digital media
Technology in society
Child and adolescent psychiatry
Educational psychology